Lussivolutopsius is a genus of sea snails in the family Buccinidae, the true whelks.

Species
Species within the genus Lussivolutopsius include:
Lussivolutopsius emphaticus (Dall, 1907)
Lussivolutopsius filosus (Dall, 1919)
Lussivolutopsius furukawai (Oyama, 1951)
Lussivolutopsius hydractiniferus (Kantor, 1983)
Lussivolutopsius ivanovi (Kantor, 1983)
Lussivolutopsius limatus (Dall, 1907)
Lussivolutopsius marinae (Kantor, 1984)
Lussivolutopsius memmi (Kantor, 1990)
Lussivolutopsius ochotensis (Kantor, 1986)
Lussivolutopsius strelzovae (Kantor, 1990)

References

Buccinidae
Gastropod genera